The parliament of Poland is the bicameral legislature of Poland. It is composed of an upper house (the Senate) and a lower house (the Sejm). Both houses are accommodated in the Sejm complex in Warsaw. The Constitution of Poland does not refer to the Parliament as a body, but only to the Sejm and Senate.

Members of both houses are elected by direct election, usually every four years. The Sejm has 460 members, while the Senate has 100 senators. To become law, a bill must first be approved by both houses, but the Sejm can override a Senate refusal to pass a bill.

On certain occasions, the Marshal of the Sejm summons the National Assembly, a joint session of the members of both houses. It is mostly ceremonial in nature, and it only convenes occasionally, such as to witness the inauguration of the President. Under exceptional circumstances, the constitution endows the National Assembly with great responsibilities and powers, such as to bring the President before the State Tribunal (impeachment). The current leading party in the Sejm is the Law and Justice (PiS) party with 226 out of 460 seats in Sejm whereas with 48 out of 100 seats in Senate (thus controlled by opposition parties, currently: Civil Coalition, The Left, and Polish People's Party). The two debating halls have designated seats for the deputies, senators and the single Marshal (speaker) of each.  Senators and deputies are equipped with voting devices.

Parliamentary groups and affiliations 
After election deputies and senators will remain or splinter into deputy or senatorial groupings, or have no affiliations and sit as "independents". In both chambers, there are two formal sizes of groups: Clubs (() which are the entire party groups of the elected, where none have splintered away or defected to another ) and circles (()). The primary difference between these is the degree of right to join and contribute to the relevant Seniors' Konwent, the procedural committee that determines the drafting of agendas and chamber workings.

In the Sejm,
Clubs consists of at least 15 deputies;
Circles consists of at least 3 deputies.

In the Senate,
Clubs consists of at least 7 senators;
Circles consists of at least 3 senators.

National Assembly

The National Assembly is the name of a joint sitting of the Sejm and the Senate. It is headed by the Marshal of the Sejm (or by the Marshal of the Senate when the former is absent).

Under the 1997 Constitution of Poland the National Assembly has the authority to
declare the President's permanent incapacity to exercise his duties due to the state of his health (by a majority vote of at least two-thirds of the statutory number of members),
bring an indictment against the President to the State Tribunal (by a majority of at least two-thirds of the statutory number of members, on the motion of at least 140 members),
adopt its own rules of procedure.
The National Assembly is also called in order to
receive the President's oath of office,
hear a presidential address (however, the President may choose to deliver his address to either the Sejm or the Senate).

In the periods 1922–1935 and 1989–1990, it was this joint sitting which elected the President of the Republic of Poland by an absolute majority of votes. In and from 1935, it was replaced by an Assembly of Electors, which consisted of the Marshal of the Senate (as president of the Assembly of Electors), the Marshal of the Sejm, the Prime Minister, the Chief Justice, the General Armed Forces Inspector, 50 electors elected by the Sejm, and 25 electors elected by the Senate. The Senate was abolished in 1946 so in 1947 Bolesław Bierut was elected President only by the Sejm. There were no presidents from 1952 until 1989 when the Senate was restored and the National Assembly elected Wojciech Jaruzelski as President.

Since 1990, the President has been elected by the people. However, the President is still sworn in before the National Assembly, which is also the only organ which can declare the President's permanent incapacity to perform his duties, or bring an indictment against him before State Tribunal.

From 1992 to 1997, the National Assembly drafted and passed a new Constitution, which was approved by a national referendum on 25 May 1997.

Current standings

Notes

References

Government of Poland
Poland
Politics of Poland
Sejm
Senate of Poland